Cap Anamur is a humanitarian organisation with the goal of helping refugees and displaced people worldwide.

In 1979, amidst the rising number of Vietnamese boat people fleeing Vietnam in unseaworthy crafts, Christel and Rupert Neudeck, together with a group of friends, formed the committee "A ship for Vietnam" to rescue the refugees. For the rescue mission the group chartered the freighter Cap Anamur, named after the French name of Cape Anamur, a cape on the Turkish Mediterranean coast near the city of Anamur that marks the southernmost point of Anatolia. The journeys of Cap Anamur (and her sister ships afterwards) were – against the predictions of many pundits – a huge success: 10,375 boat people were rescued on the open sea and an additional 35,000 were medically treated.

References

External links
Cap Anamur website 
Cap Anamur website 

Charities based in Germany
Vietnamese refugees